Mill Township is one of the twenty-two townships of Tuscarawas County, Ohio, United States.  The 2000 census found 10,290 people in the township, 1,835 of whom lived in the unincorporated portions of the township.

Geography
Located in the eastern part of the county, it borders the following townships:
Union Township - north
Monroe Township, Harrison County - northeast
Franklin Township, Harrison County - southeast
Rush Township - south
Warwick Township - west
Goshen Township - northwest

Several municipalities are located in Mill Township:
Part of the village of Dennison, in the north
Part of the village of Midvale, in the northwest
The city of Uhrichsville, in the center

Name and history
It is the only Mill Township statewide.

Government
The township is governed by a three-member board of trustees, who are elected in November of odd-numbered years to a four-year term beginning on the following January 1. Two are elected in the year after the presidential election and one is elected in the year before it. There is also an elected township fiscal officer, who serves a four-year term beginning on April 1 of the year after the election, which is held in November of the year before the presidential election. Vacancies in the fiscal officership or on the board of trustees are filled by the remaining trustees.  The current trustees are John Edwards, Chett Peters, and Jerry Piccin, and the fiscal officer is J.J. Ong.

References

External links
County website

Townships in Tuscarawas County, Ohio
Townships in Ohio